A list of films produced by the Bollywood film industry based in Mumbai in 1937:

1937
Some of the notable films of 1937:

Vidyapati was a biopic directed by Nitin Bose for New Theatres. It starred Pahari Sanyal as the Maithili poet and Vaishnava saint Vidyapati. The bold songs of the film ensured crowds at the theatres making it a big success of 1937.

Duniya Na Mane (Marathi:Kunku) was a social film from Prabhat Film Company directed by V. Shantaram. It dealt with the issue of arranged marriage. The film did well in the theatres and according to Baburao Patel of Filmindia it "recorded better returns... than any other picture before".

President was produced by New Theatres and directed by Nitin Bose. A love triangle with a social content it highlighted the plight of mill workers. The music was popular with a classic from Saigal, Ik Bangla Bane Nyaara.

Kisan Kanya made by Ardeshir Irani of Alam Ara (1931) fame was the first colour film to be processed in India. The film however did not do well at the box office due to "a weak story".

Jeevan Prabhat was a successful social film from Bombay Talkies directed by Franz Osten. It starred Kishore Sahu in his debut film with Devika Rani and Mumtaz Ali.

A-B

C-D

F-I

J-K

L-M

N-P

Q-S

T-Z

References

External links
 Bollywood films of 1937 at the IMDb

1937
Bollywood
Films, Bollywood